Jordan Murray may refer to:

Jordan Murray (Canadian football), American gridiron football player
Jordan Murray (ice hockey), Canadian ice hockey player
Jordan Murray (soccer), Australian footballer